Newport is a census-designated place in eastern Newport Township, Washington County, Ohio, United States.  It has a post office with the ZIP code 45768.  Newport lies along the Ohio River several miles above the county seat of Marietta.  Today its main street is designated as State Route 7.

Newport is the location of the Carpenter Bridge, which carries State Route 807 over the Ohio River. It is the first bridge over the Ohio River above Marietta.

Demographics
As of the census of 2010, there were 1003 people, 399 households, and 296 families residing in the town. The racial makeup of the town was 98.8% White, 0.6% Asian, 0.1% Native American, and 0.5% from two or more races. Hispanic or Latino of any race were 0.4% of the population.

There were 399 households, of which 23.3% had children under the age of 18 living with them, 61.9% were married couples living together, 8.5% had a female householder with no husband present, 3.8% had a male householder with no wife present, and 25.8% were non-families. 22.3% of all households were made up of individuals, and 11.5% had someone living alone who was 65 years of age or older. The average household size was 2.51 and the average family size was 2.92.

The median age in the town was 42 years. The gender makeup of the town was 48.6% male and 51.4% female.

History
The first European-American settlement at Newport was made as early as 1798, as settlers from Massachusetts were the first to make their home. However, the site was not platted until 1839. A post office called Newport has been in operation since 1815. 

The first Church in the settlement was established by the Methodists in 1825, followed in the next decades by Presbyterians, Baptists, and a Church of Christ. 

Newport has had little industry in its history. Copper shops, cigar factories, and mills have all come and gone in the settlement's first century.

A short distance southwest of Newport on what is now SR7 is the Judge Joseph Barker House. Built in 1832, it is listed on the National Register of Historic Places.

References

External links
County website
Community history

Census-designated places in Washington County, Ohio
Ohio populated places on the Ohio River